Brian R. Murphy is an American virologist and former co-chief of the Laboratory of Infectious Diseases at the National Institute of Allergy and Infectious Disease.

Education and career
Brian Murphy was born in 1942. He completed his undergraduate B.S. degree from Wesleyan University in 1964. He then went on to medical training, completing his M.D. in 1969 at the University of Rochester Medical School, and internship the next year at Stanford University Hospital. He moved to the National Institutes of Health in 1970 as a research associate in the Laboratory of Infectious Diseases within the National Institute of Allergy and Infectious Disease. In 1983, he was promoted to head the respiratory viruses section of the Laboratory of Infectious Diseases. In 2001, he became co-chief of the Laboratory of Infectious Diseases with Robert H. Purcell. He retired from the National Institutes of Health in 2010.

Brian Murphy received the inaugural Robert M. Chanock award for lifetime achievements in RSV research at the Respiratory Syncytial Virus 2003 symposium in November 2003.

He served on the editorial board of the Journal of Virology.

Research
Murphy's research has focused on vaccine development for various viruses. In particular, his group is known for working on developing vaccines against respiratory syncytial virus, parainfluenza virus, influenza virus, dengue virus, and West Nile virus.

Notable publications

Subbarao K, McAuliffe J... Murphy B (2004). Prior infection and passive transfer of neutralizing antibody prevent replication of severe acute respiratory syndrome coronavirus in the respiratory tract of mice. Journal of Virology. 78(7): pgs. 3572-3577
Wright PF, Karron RA.. Murphy BR (2000). Evaluation of a live, cold-passaged, temperature-sensitive, respiratory syncytial virus vaccine candidate in infancy. Journal of Infectious Diseases. 182(5): pgs. 1331-1342
Collins PL, Hill MG... Murphy BR (1995). Production of infectious human respiratory syncytial virus from cloned cDNA confirms an essential role for the transcription elongation factor from the 5' proximal open reading frame of the M2 mRNA in gene expression and provides a capability for vaccine development. Proceedings of the National Academy of Sciences. 92(25): pgs. 11563-11567
Subbarao EK, London W, Murphy BR (1993). A single amino acid in the PB2 gene of influenza A virus is a determinant of host range. Journal of Virology. 67(4): pgs. 1761-1764
Clements ML, Betts RF... Murphy BR (1986). Serum and nasal wash antibodies associated with resistance to experimental challenge with influenza A wild-type virus. Journal of Clinical Microbiology. 24(1): pgs. 157-160

References

1942 births
American molecular biologists
20th-century American scientists
Vaccinologists
Wesleyan University alumni
National Institutes of Health faculty
University of Rochester alumni
American virologists
Living people